The 2012 Open GDF Suez de Marseille was a professional tennis tournament played on outdoor clay courts. It was the fifteenth edition of the tournament and was part of the 2012 ITF Women's Circuit. It took place in Marseille, France, on 11–17 June 2012.

WTA entrants

Seeds 

 Rankings as of 28 May 2012

Other entrants 
The following players received wildcards into the singles main draw:
  Anaïs Laurendon
  Elixane Lechemia
  Constance Sibille
  Alison Van Uytvanck

The following players received entry from the qualifying draw:
  Manon Arcangioli
  Rocío de la Torre Sánchez
  Myrtille Georges
  Jessica Pegula

The following player received entry from a special exempt spot:
  Beatriz García Vidagany

Champions

Singles 

  Lourdes Domínguez Lino def.  Pauline Parmentier 6–3, 6–3

Doubles 

  Séverine Beltrame /  Laura Thorpe def.  Kristina Barrois /  Olga Savchuk 6–1, 6–4

External links 
 Official website
 2012 Open GDF Suez de Marseille at ITFtennis.com

Open GDF Suez de Marseille
2012 in French tennis
Open Féminin de Marseille